A Vorlage (from the German for prototype or template) is a prior version or manifestation of a text under consideration.  It may refer to such a version of a text itself, a particular manuscript of the text, or a more complex manifestation of the text (e.g., a group of copies, or a group of excerpts).  Thus, the original-language version of a text which a translator then works into a translation is called the Vorlage of that translation. For example, the Luther Bible is a translation of the Textus Receptus, so the Textus Receptus is the Vorlage of the Luther Bible.  

Sometimes the Vorlage of a translation may be lost to history.  In some of these cases the Vorlage may be reconstructed from the translation.  Such a reconstructed Vorlage may be called a retroversion, and it invariably is made with some amount of uncertainty.  Nevertheless, the Vorlage may still be reconstructed in some parts at such a level of confidence that the translation and its retroversion can be used as a witness for the purposes of textual criticism.  This reconstructed Vorlage may stand on its own as the sole witness of the original-language text, or it may be compared and used along with other witnesses.  Thus, for example, scholars use the reconstructed Vorlage of the Greek Septuagint translation of the Hebrew Bible at parts to correct the Hebrew Masoretic version when trying to determine oldest version of the Hebrew Bible that they can infer.  Or, as another example, the Coptic fragments of Plato's Republic included among the Nag Hammadi library are used to help attest to the original Greek text which Plato himself wrote.  For the bulk of the Gospel of Thomas, the Vorlage exists only as a retroversion of the Coptic translation, as no other witness to the original Greek text for most of the sayings recorded therein is known.

References

Applied linguistics
Biblical criticism
Written communication
Humanities
Textual criticism
Translation
Textual scholarship